Air Transport Wing 63 was a wing of the German Air Force (Luftwaffe). The wing was created in 1957 and was last based at Hohn Air Base in Schleswig-Holstein, Germany, operating the last German Transall C-160 fixed-wing aircraft.

In December 2021, the wing was disbanded with the phaseout of its Transall aircraft in favour of the Airbus A400M, which are all stationed in Wunstorf. A contingent of 60 will maintain Hohn Air Base as a reserve airfield for Tactical Wing 51 from Jagel.

Commanding officers
Oberstleutnant Wilhelm Batz, 15 December 1961 – 31 January 1964
Oberst Horst Rudat, 1 February 1964 – 31 March 1971
Oberst Dr. Heinz-Ulrich Beuther, 1 April 1971 – 31 March 1979
Oberst Hubert Marquitan, 1 April 1979 – 30 September 1980
Oberst Rudi Gutzeit, 1 October 1980 – 30 September 1986
Oberst Jürgen Reiss, 1 October 1986 – 31 March 1991
Oberst Joachim Mörsdorf, 1 April 1991 – 30 September 1993
Oberst Hans-Otto Elger, 1 October 1993 – 31 March 1995
Oberst Hans-Jürgen Ochs, 1 April 1995 – 30 September 1998
Oberst Hans-Jürgen Miunske, 1 October 1998 – 27 March 2003
Oberst Helmut Fritzsche, 28 March 2003 – 27 March 2006
Oberst Manfred Merten, 27 March 2006 – 25 February 2010
Oberst Stefan W. Neumann, 25 February 2010 – 18 June 2012
Oberst Hartmut Zitzewitz, 19 June 2012 – 22 October 2018
Oberst Markus Kleinbauer, 22 October 2018 - 15 December 2021

References

Further reading

External links

Air transport wings of the German Air Force
Military units and formations established in 1961